Patal (also Romanized as Pātal) is a village in Sornabad Rural District, Hamaijan District, Sepidan County, Fars Province, Iran. In the 2006 census, its population was 26, in the form of 8 families.

References 

Populated places in Sepidan County